John Clark Knox (October 13, 1881 – August 23, 1966) was a United States district judge of the United States District Court for the Southern District of New York from 1918 to 1966 and its first chief judge from 1948 to 1955.

Education and career

Born on October 13, 1881, in Waynesburg, Pennsylvania, Knox received an Artium Baccalaureus degree in 1902 from Waynesburg College and after attending the University of Pennsylvania Law School, read law in 1904. He was an attorney with the Law Department of the Title Guarantee and Trust Company in New York City, New York from 1905 to 1913. He was an Assistant United States Attorney for the Southern District of New York from 1913 to 1918.

Federal judicial service
Knox was nominated by President Woodrow Wilson on March 29, 1918, to a seat on the United States District Court for the Southern District of New York vacated by Judge Martin Thomas Manton. He was confirmed by the United States Senate on April 12, 1918, and received his commission the same day. He served as chief judge from 1948 to 1955. He assumed senior status on April 30, 1955. His service terminated on August 23, 1966, due to his death.

Legacy

Knox wrote two books on his judicial service, A Judge Comes of Age (1940) and Order in the Court (1943).

References

External links
 

1881 births
1966 deaths
20th-century American judges
Assistant United States Attorneys
Judges of the United States District Court for the Southern District of New York
People from Waynesburg, Pennsylvania
United States district court judges appointed by Woodrow Wilson
University of Pennsylvania Law School alumni
Waynesburg University alumni
Place of death missing